Celeste M. Stiehl (née Sullivan) (born September 7, 1925) was an American politician.

Biography
Born in Belleville, Illinois, Stiehl went to the Belleville public schools and the Katherine Gibbs School in New York. She was involved with civic and political activities. Stiehl served in the Illinois House of Representatives from 1975 until 1983 and was a Republican. Her husband was William Donald Stiehl who served as a United States District Court judge.

References

1925 births
Living people
People from Belleville, Illinois
Gibbs College alumni
Women state legislators in Illinois
Republican Party members of the Illinois House of Representatives
21st-century American women